Maid of the Mist is a boat tour of Niagara Falls.

Maid of the Mist can also refer to the following:

 Maid of the Mist Incline, a former funicular railway
 Maid of the Mist Stakes, a horse race
 Maid of the Mist (film), a 1915 American silent drama film
 Maid of the Mist, a statue at Boston Public Gardens
 Maid of the Mist, a 1985 album by BZN

See also
 Anne of Geierstein, or The Maiden of the Mist, an 1829 novel by Sir Walter Scott